Nebulatettix is a genus of band-winged grasshoppers in the family Acrididae. There are at least three described species in Nebulatettix, found in North America.

Species
These species belong to the genus Nebulatettix:
 Nebulatettix pallidus (Bruner, 1893)
 Nebulatettix robustus (Rehn & Hebard, 1909)
 Nebulatettix subgracilis (Caudell, 1903) (Southwestern Dusky Grasshopper)

References

External links

 

Acrididae